Cloughgrenan (also spelled Cloughgrennan, Clogrenan and Clogrennan) is a historic geographic location in Ireland which gives its name to two townlands in county County Laois and one in County Carlow, spanning a total area of . 

Cloughgrenan may refer to:

Clogrenan Formation - a geological formation
Clogrenan ED - an electoral division in County Carlow
Clogrennan Hill- a  hill in County Laois
Clogrennan House, a ruined historic big house in County Carlow
Baronet of Cloughgrenan -  a peerage title

People
Baron Butler of Cloughgrenan or Earl of Arran, a title in both the Peerage of Scotland and the Peerage of Ireland
Sir Edmund Butler of Cloughgrenan (1534–1602), second son of James Butler, 9th Earl of Ormond and Lady Joan Fitzgerald
Sir Thomas Butler, 1st Baronet of Cloughgrenan (died 1642), Irish nobleman, illegitimate son of Sir Edmund Butler of Cloughgrenan
Sir Thomas Butler, 3rd Baronet of Cloughgrenan (died 1704), Irish baronet and politician
Sir Pierce Butler, 4th Baronet of Cloughgrenan (1670–1732), Irish politician and baronet
Sir Richard Butler, 5th Baronet of Cloughgrenan (1699–1771), Irish politician and baronet
Sir Thomas Butler, 6th Baronet of Cloughgrenan (1735–1772), Irish politician and baronet
Sir Richard Butler, 7th Baronet of Cloughgrenan (1761–1817), Anglo-Irish politician